Ali Ahmad may refer to:
 Ali Ahmad (cricketer) (born 1995), Afghan cricketer
 Ali Ahmad (politician) (1930–1977), Malaysian politician
 Ali Ahmad, known popularly as Ali Kalora (1981–2021), Indonesian Islamic militant and leader